1956 in philosophy

Events

Publications 
 Benjamin Lee Whorf, Language, Thought and Reality (published posthumously in 1956)
 Erich Fromm, The Art of Loving (1956)
 A. J. Ayer, The Problem of Knowledge (1956)

Births 
 February 24 - Judith Butler
 Shelly Kagan

Deaths 
 January 29 - H. L. Mencken (born 1880)
 July 29 - Ludwig Klages (born 1872)
 October 30 - Pío Baroja (born 1872)

References 

Philosophy
20th-century philosophy
Philosophy by year